Anna Rebecka Hofstad (7 April 1878 in Offersøy, Norway – 12 October 1901 in Tornehamn, Sweden), known in history as Svarta Bjorn (Black Bear); Norwegian: Svarta Bjørn, Swedish:Svarta Björn, was a Norwegian cook, active as a cantine cook for the railway Navvy workers during the construction of the Iron Ore Line between Kiruna and Narvik in 1899-1901. She has been treated as a local legend in the history of the area and became the object of fiction.

She has been described as tall, dark, beautiful and intelligent. A reason for her fame may be the fact that during this period of settlement in the area, she was one of few women there, and was therefore idealized as an icon among the railway workers.

According to the legend, she died during a fight with another railway cook, who broke her ribs and gave her a fatal blow to the head. She was taken to the infirmary in Tornehamn, where she died. At the time of her death, she was also to have suffered from tuberculosis, which may also have contributed to her death. She was buried in the Tornehamn Navvy workers cemetery. The white cross on her grave does not mention her entire name, but only names her as "Anna".

In 1979, a Swedish film was made about her: Legenden om Svarta Björn (The Legend of Svarta Björn) by Ingvar Skogsberg.

Sources
Christiansen, Sverre (1987). ”Om Svarta Bjørn”. Årbok for Helgeland "1987(18),": sid. 35-40 : ill.. 0801-4221. ISSN 0801-4221. Libris 9421415

1878 births
1901 deaths
Norwegian chefs
Women chefs
Kiruna